Jelisaveta is a given name that may refer to:

 Jelisaveta of Hungary, Queen of Serbia (d. 1313)
 Jelisaveta Nemanjić, Princess of Serbia and Bosnia (d. 1331)
 Jelisaveta, monastic name of Serbian Empress Jelena (d. 1374)
 Jelisaveta Kotromanić, Princess of Bosnia, Queen of Hungary (d. 1387)
 Jelisaveta, Princess of Serbia and Yugoslavia (b. 1936)
 Jelisaveta Načić (1878-1955)
 Jelisaveta Sablić (b. 1942)
 Jelisaveta Veljković (b. 1951)
 Jelisaveta Orašanin (b. 1988)

See also
 Elizabeth (given name)
 Elizabeth (disambiguation)
 Elizaveta (disambiguation)
 Elisaveta (disambiguation)